The 2019 FIVB Volleyball Men's Challenger Cup was the second edition of the FIVB Volleyball Men's Challenger Cup, an annual men's international volleyball tournament contested by 6 national teams that acts as a qualifier for the FIVB Volleyball Men's Nations League. The tournament was held in Ljubljana, Slovenia from 3 to 7 July 2019.

Slovenia won the title, defeating Cuba in the final, and earned the right to participate in the 2020 Nations League replacing Portugal, the last placed challenger team after the 2019 edition. Belarus defeated Turkey in the 3rd place match.

On 8 May 2020, FIVB announced that the 2020 Nations League and 2020 Challenger Cup was canceled due to COVID-19 pandemic. So the tournament eventually became the 2021 Nations League qualifier.

Qualification

Pools composition
Teams were seeded following the serpentine system according to their FIVB World Ranking as of 1 October 2018. FIVB reserved the right to seed the hosts as head of pool A regardless of the World Ranking. Not more than two teams from the same Continental Confederation can go into a same pool. In case the third team from the same Continental Confederation is placed in the same pool as per the World Ranking, the third team will move to the other pool. Rankings are shown in brackets except the hosts who ranked 17th.

Squads

Venue

Pool standing procedure
 Number of matches won
 Match points
 Sets ratio
 Points ratio
 Result of the last match between the tied teams

Match won 3–0 or 3–1: 3 match points for the winner, 0 match points for the loser
Match won 3–2: 2 match points for the winner, 1 match point for the loser

Preliminary round
All times are Central European Summer Time (UTC+02:00).

Pool A

|}

|}

Pool B

|}

|}

Final round
All times are Central European Summer Time (UTC+02:00).

Semifinals
|}

Third place match
|}

Final
|}

Final standing

See also
2019 FIVB Volleyball Men's Nations League
2019 FIVB Volleyball Women's Challenger Cup

References

External links
Fédération Internationale de Volleyball – official website
2019 Challenger Cup – official website

FIVB Volleyball Men's Challenger Cup
FIVB
2019 in Slovenian sport
International volleyball competitions hosted by Slovenia
FIVB Volleyball Men's Challenger Cup
Sport in Ljubljana